Mons Maenalus (Latin for Mount Maenalus) was a constellation created by Johannes Hevelius in 1687. It was located between the constellations of Boötes and Virgo, and depicts a mountain in Greece that the herdsman is stepping upon. It was increasingly considered obsolete by the latter half of the 19th century. Its brightest star is 31 Boötis, a G-type giant of apparent magnitude  4.86m.

References

Former constellations
Constellations listed by Johannes Hevelius